Amarkalam is a 1999 Indian Tamil-language romantic action film written and directed by Saran and produced by V. Sudhir Kumar. The film stars Ajith Kumar and Shalini, with Raghuvaran, Raadhika and Nassar in supporting roles.

Amarkalam was Ajith's 25th film. The film released on 13 August 1999 to positive reviews from critics and became a commercial success. The film was dubbed in Telugu as Adbutham. It was also remade in Telugu as Leela Mahal Center and in Kannada as Asura.

Plot
Vasu is a ruthless hooligan who lives in a cinema theater owned by Aarumugam. He had a tortured childhood and wastes his days by drinking, fighting, and sleeping. It all starts when Vasu's friend, Thilak, loses an Annaamalai movie reel to Mohana. Vasu and Mohana clash when he attempts to retrieve the reel. Mohana's family are members of the police, headed by Birla Bose, Mohana's father. At this point, Tulasi Das, an ex-mafia "dada" who spent many years in jail because of Bose, comes to the theater. He does not like Bose and hires Vasu to kidnap Mohana. Vasu later cries out his childhood pain in the song "Satham Illatha." Mohana falls in love with Vasu after hearing his pain. When Tulasi realizes that Mohana loves Vasu, he hires Vasu to pretend that he loves her back. At first, it is just pretended, but then he too begins to love her. Tulasi visits Bose to inform him of his daughter's love for a gangster and realizes that Mohana is indeed his daughter. A flashback showing the parted friendship between the two men, and Ganga, Tulasi's wife, abandons him and their child when she discovers that her husband is a don. Knowing that Mohana is his daughter, Tulasi instructs Vasu to give up his love. When Vasu refuses, Tulasi visits Mohana and tells her about his ploy and that Vasu's love for her was fake. Eventually, Vasu proves to Mohana that his love was true and unites with her after a clash between the cops and some goons of the locality.

Cast

 Ajith Kumar as Vasu
 Shalini as Mohana
 Raghuvaran as Tulasi Das, Mohana's father
 Nassar as Commissioner Birla Bose, Mohana's adoptive father
 Raadhika as Ganga, Mohana's mother
 Ambika as Sharadha, Mohana's adoptive mother
 Vinu Chakravarthy as Aarumugam, cinema theatre owner
 Dhamu as Thilak, Vasu's friend
 Ramesh Khanna as Singampuli, Vasu's friend
 Charle as Thomas, Mohana's friend
 Poovilangu Mohan as DCP Ranjith Bose, Birla Bose's brother
 Ponnambalam as Aasairaj
 Ramji as Kutty
 Mahanadi Shankar as Kasi, Aasairaj's assistant
 Vaiyapuri as Mani
 Manish Borundia as a kidnapped man
 Karnaa Radha
 Raghava Lawrence in a special appearance in the song "Kaalam Kalikalam"

Production

Development
The producers of the previous collaboration of Ajith Kumar and Saran during Kaadhal Mannan (1998), Venkateswaralayam had lost a lot of money on that film so Ajith Kumar insisted on doing another film for the studio. The film initially began production without a script but only title Amarkalam being revealed.

Saran initially came up with a script revolving around a gangster who loses his eyesight and makes a lot of enemies; however he changed the script when his friends told him that several films on a similar subject were made at that time. He built a story around a setup of "a father meets his daughter without she releasing that he was her dad" based on a film he had seen and made this script completely into "a hero-centric film".

Casting
Jyothika was the first choice for the lead actress but couldn't accept it due to scheduling conflicts. Saran initially approached Shalini, who was studying at the time, and she refused, but after a three-month pursuit, he finally got her to sign on as well. Saran wanted Shalini because he found her "eyes to be arresting" and she gained "image of 'everybody’s adorable daughter' after Kadhalukku Mariyadhai", which he felt would be right for this role. The role of Tulasi Das was initially offered to Amitabh Bachchan who accepted before later pulling out of the film. Raghuvaran was Saran's next choice for the role who agreed because Saran felt "he’d understand this complex character, who wasn’t a violent one or routine villain character. Also, I was particular that no one should be able to guess the film’s turning point".

Filming
The film began production in January 1999 and during the production of the film, the lead pair Ajith Kumar and Shalini fell in love and eventually got married in April 2000. For the lead protagonist's staying place, Saran decided to use film theatre as a backdrop, he found Srinivasa Theatre after looking at its infrastructure.

Soundtrack

The music was composed by Bharadwaj, with lyrics written by Vairamuthu. Shalini sang a song in the film, with Saran recommending her after he had heard her humming to a tune. Saran did not want the song "Satham Illamal" to be cinematic for that he created a sad past of Ajith Kumar's character to justify the presence of the song in the film. The song's lyrics were based on a poem written by Vairamuthu where every line ended with the word "vendum" (I want). [Bharadwaj] suggested that "instead of 'vendum', we should use 'kaetaen' (I asked), so that the song would convey that the hero asked for everything, but ultimately didn’t get any, including death". S. P.  Balasubrahmanyam performed this song in an breathless manner.

Release
The film released on 13 August 1999. The reviewer from Indolink wrote, "There are no compelling performances to give sheen to the fairly complex plot cooked up by director Charan in Amarkalam. The director's screenplay also loses steam midway resulting in a lukewarm payoff to a good premise. The end product plays out like a dull rehash of Puthiya pathai and numerous other gangster movies". Kalki wrote the director created huge expectations, love element which was barely touched became a main focal point in second half, what could have been a first class film became an average film.

The film went on to become a large success at the box office, extending Ajith Kumar's success after his previous film Vaali. Ajith went on to purchase Saran a car as a token of gratitude for the success.

Re-release
A digitally restored version of Amarkalam was released in May 2014 celebrating the 43rd birthday of Ajith.

Remakes
Due to the success of the film, it was subsequently dubbed into the Telugu language with title Adbhutam and produced by V. Sathyanarayana. It was later remade in Kannada as Asura starring Shiva Rajkumar and Raghuvaran, who reprised his role. Despite the release of dubbed version there was a 2004 remake version in Telugu titled Leela Mahal Center with Aryan Rajesh.

References

External links
 

1999 films
Films set in Chennai
1990s romantic action films
Films scored by Bharadwaj (composer)
Tamil films remade in other languages
1990s Tamil-language films
Films directed by Saran
Indian romantic action films